Kuch Rang Pyar Ke Aise Bhi (English Title: Some Shades Of Love like this too) is an Indian Hindi-language romantic drama television series which aired on 29 February 2016 to 12 November 2021 on Sony Entertainment Television. It stars Erica Fernandes, Shaheer Sheikh and Supriya Pilgaonkar.

The second season of the show aired from 25 September 2017 to 2 November 2017 lasting for 26 episodes. A third season Kuch Rang Pyar Ke Aise Bhi: Nayi Kahaani started airing on SET India on 12 July 2021. Post leap, the show was about the journey of the characters to their maturation. Some of the highlights are understanding, realizations, character developments, and a matured edition of reunion of separated lovers.

Series overview

Season 1 

The show explores work in progress relationship of Sonakshi "Sona" Bose and Devrath "Dev" Dixit. Dev lost his father at a young age and hence his mother brought up him and his three sisters singlehandedly. Seeing his mother struggle so much despite of all the hardships made him deeply venerate her. But due to unfavorable financial circumstances she could only educate Dev and his younger sister Neha was left at home to take care of his two younger sisters. Now Dev is a successful business tycoon who lives with his mother Ishwari and three sisters, Neha, Riya and Nikki. Dev owes everything to his mother and has a feeling of indebtedness and complete devotion for her, and her entire life revolves around him. He has become a workaholic and short tempered as a result of his childhood hardships, but is kind hearted and will go to any extent to help others. Neha, though loves her family, still has resentment in her heart and feels that her mother has done partiality among her children, only educating Dev and depriving her of any opportunities. Hearing her harsh words, Ishwari faints and Dev calls a doctor. Dr. Sinha tells him that his mother has history of such fatigue due to improper nutrition and recommends him a nutritional consultant, Dr. Sonakshi Bose. Dr. Sonakshi is a quick-witted, lively young doctor who is from a Kolkata-based, Bengali family of five living in Delhi.

Sona is a young and vibrant nutritionist who is hired by Dev to take care of Ishwari's health. Sona and Ishwari develop a friendly bond, and her health improves. Dev and Sonakshi get off on the wrong foot. She thinks of him as rude and he thinks of her as stubborn; but they eventually understand each other better. When Sona faces an accident, Dev saves her and takes care of her. On seeing his soft side and caring nature, she starts to fall for him. Sparks fly between Sona and Dev as he also falls in love. They start dating and fall deeply in love with each other. Dev gradually becomes more cheerful and carefree. When Ishwari learns of their relationship she is heartbroken as she fears that she will be replaced by Sona in Dev's life. When Dev realizes that his mother does not approve of this relationship, he takes a practical decision and decides to part ways, leaving Sona heartbroken. But Dev is unable to forget Sona and descends into a downward spiral. Sona agrees to marry the guy her father chose for her but their engagement is broken off when Sona leaves her fiancé in the middle of her engagement to tend to Dev's wounds. Ishwari realizes that Dev cannot be happy without Sona, and agrees to their marriage. Sona and Dev reconcile and get married.

Dev and Sona settle into their married life, and days pass by. Although Ishwari maintains that she is happy for them, she is still slightly uncomfortable with Sona's presence in Dev's life, and hasn't completely accepted her yet. Dev struggles to balance between his duties as husband and son. Months pass by.
Vicky and Radharani create misunderstandings between Sona and Ishwari following which Sona leaves the house. Dev unable to face this leaves the house and goes to the farmhouse where Vicky gets him drunk and cheats him into signing papers, increasing the misunderstandings. Sona begins to lose faith in Dev. She finally meets Dev at the farmhouse where they have an explosive argument. After a bitter exchange of words, Dev and Sona part ways.

7 Years Later 
Sona is now a successful businesswoman magnate living in Kolkata with her family and six-year-old daughter Suhana, while Dev becomes a casanova, not knowing that he and Sona have a daughter. She shifts to Delhi for business purposes and unknowningly buys a portion of Dev's office. Eventually, while befriending Suhana as she and his nephew Golu study in the same school, Dev sees her with Sona and finds the truth about her. Dev is overjoyed to know he has a daughter and becomes a loving father to her. Sona and Dev decide to stay in each others house for one week each for the sake of Suhana's happiness. Sonakshi's brother Saurav marries Ronita. Dev and Sona have a heart to heart talk wherein they admit they were equally responsible for the failure of their marriage. They forgive each other and are finally able to let go of they bitterness they held for each other, and become friends. Meanwhile, Ishwari starts liking Sona after saving her from Khatri(a man who had been blackmailing Ishwari by framing her for a crime she did not commit). Ishwari finally lets go of her biased view and starts seeing Sona in a new light. Reflecting on the past, she realizes her mistakes and apologizes to Sona, and finally accepts her as her own daughter. During all this, Dev and Sona realize that they still love each other, and reunite. They learn from their past mistakes and build a stable relationship. Sonakshi helps Dev correcting his mistakes he had done in those seven years and hence brings all the members of the Dixit family back together. She and Dev then find out that Vicky was the main cause for all their misunderstandings, and Dev throws him out of the house. Sonakshi gets pregnant again, and Dev is overjoyed that he gets to relive the journey he missed with Suhana. Vicky, now a changed man, comes back and apologises, and is welcomed back into the family. Sonakshi gives birth to a baby boy named Shubh.

Season 1 ends on a happy note with Sona giving birth to their second child Shubh, with the entire family united.

Season 2
This season explores the life of Sona and Dev after the birth of their second child, Shubh. Dev quits his business temporarily to let Sona pursue her dream, much to Ishwari's dismay. It shows Sona a working woman and Dev as a househusband.

The season also focuses on how Dev changes the education pattern of their children's school and how Suhana and Golu fall victim to a dangerous game. It also focuses on Saurabh and Ronita's experience as first-time parents.

Dev then becomes an RJ and the family celebrates his success. Season 2 ends as Shubh says Maa and Papa for the first time.

Cast

Main
Erica Fernandes as Dr. Sonakshi "Sona" Bose Dixit: Bijoy and Asha's daughter; Saurabh's sister; Dev's wife; Ayush, Suhana and Shubh's mother (2016–2017)
Shaheer Sheikh as Devrath "Dev" Dixit: Ishwari and Pankaj's son; Neha, Riya and Nikki's elder brother; Sonakshi's husband; Ayush, Suhana and Shubh's father (2016–2017)
Supriya Pilgaonkar as Ishwari Tripathi Dixit: Baldev's sister; Pankaj's wife; Dev, Neha, Riya and Nikki's mother; Ayush, Suhana and Shubh's grandmother (2016–2017)

Recurring
 Moonmoon Banerjee as Asha Bose: Bijoy's wife; Saurabh and Sonakshi's mother; Ayush, Suhana, Shubh and Mishti's grandmother  (2016–2017)
 Jagat Rawat as Bijoy Bose: Asha's husband; Saurabh and Sonakshi's father; Ayush, Suhana, Shubh and Mishti's grandfather (2016–2017, 2021)
 Rina Chakraborty as Uma Devi Bose: Bijoy's mother; Saurabh, Sonakshi and Elena's grandmother (2016-2017)                                                                                                                                          
 Alia Shah as Suhana "Soha" Dixit: Sonakshi and Dev's daughter; Shubh's sister (2017)
 Vidhvaan Sharma as Shubh Dixit: Sonakshi and Dev's son; Suhana's brother (2017)
 Alpesh Dhakan as Saurabh Bose: Bijoy and Asha's son; Sonakshi's brother; Ronita's husband; Mishti's father (2016–2017)
 Khushbu Thakkar as Ronita Mandal Bose: Shankar's daughter; Saurabh's wife; Mishti's mother (2017)
 Mushtaq Khan as Baldev Tripathi: Ishwari's brother; Radha's husband; Vicky's father; Raunak's grandfather (2016–2017)
 Alka Mogha as Radha Tripathi: Baldev's wife; Vicky's mother; Raunak's grandmother (2016–2017)
 Prerna Panwar as Elena Bose Tripathi: Saurabh and Sonakshi's cousin; Vicky's wife; Raunak's mother (2016–2017)
 Vaibhav Singh as Vikram "Vicky" Tripathi: Radha and Baldev's son; Dev's cousin; Elena's husband; Raunak's father (2016–2017)
 Pragyaj Jain as Raunak "Golu" Tripathi: Vicky and Elena's son (2017)
 Chestha Bhagat as Neha Dixit: Ishwari and Pankaj's eldest daughter; Dev, Riya and Nikki's sister; Ranveer's wife (2016–2017)
 Ankita Bahuguna as Riya Dixit: Ishwari and Pankaj's second daughter; Dev, Neha and Nikki's sister; Kapil's wife; Aarohi's mother (2016-2017)
 Aashika Bhatia as Nikki Dixit: Ishwari and Pankaj's youngest daughter; Dev, Neha and Riya's sister; Lakshya's live-in girlfriend (2016–2017)
 Arjun Aneja as Ranveer: Neha's husband (2016-2017, 2021)
 Ashwini Kaul as Laksha: Nikki's boyfriend then husband (2017)
Vishesh Bansal as Child Devrath "Dev" Dixit (2016–2017)
 Roop Durgapal as Natasha Gujral: Harish's daughter; Dev's ex-fiancée and business partner (2016-2017)
 Hemant Choudhary as Dr. Jaideep Sinha: Sonakshi's former boss (2016)
 Jay Soni as Dr. Ritwick Sen: Naveen's son; Sonakshi's former fiancé (2016)
 Pankaj Kalra as Naveen Sen: Ritwick's father (2016)
 Pawan Chopra as Harish Gujral: Natasha's father (2016)
 Karmveer Choudhary as Brijesh Khatri: Ishwari's colleague and blackmailer (2016-2017)
 Ankit Gupta as Jatin Roy: Sonakshi's childhood friend and business partner (2017)
 Anju Jadhav / Ekroop Bedi as Tina Singhal: Dev's secretary (2016)
 Mohit Sinha as Bunty Makhija: Dev's friend (2016)
 Ashiesh Roy as Shankar Mandal: Ronita's father (2017)
 Jhumma Mitra as Tara Mandal: Ronita's mother (2017)
 Asma Badar as Nisha: Dev's former fiancée (2017)
 Udit Gaur as Neil Lakhotia: famous business tycoon, Sonakshi's dummy boyfriend
 Sapan Gulati as Raman: Ishwari and Laksha's office colleague
 Amita Udgata as Dadi Bua
 Romit Sharma as Kushal Roy
 Arpit Chaudhary as Ayaan Vaishisth (Riya's former marriage alliance)

Soundtrack
Soundtrack of the show were composed by Adil-Prasant. Songs were sung by Subhajit Mukherjee and Arpita Mukherjee. On 10 February 2017 the channel released a compilation of show's romantic songs on YouTube as Valentine's Day special. "Tu Mujhme Mujhse Zyaada Hai (Duet)" is one of the "Most Romantic Hindi Title Songs" among the shows telecasted by the channel.

Awards and nominations

References

External links

Kuch Rang Pyar Ke Aise Bhi on YouTube
Watch Kuch Rang Pyar Ke Aise Bhi on SonyLIV

2016 Indian television series debuts
2017 Indian television series endings
Indian television soap operas
Indian drama television series
Hindi-language television shows
Sony Entertainment Television original programming
Television shows set in Delhi